Douglas Lee Beaudoin (born May 15, 1954, in Dickinson, North Dakota) is a former American football safety in the National Football League. He was drafted by the New England Patriots in the ninth round of the 1976 NFL Draft. He played college football at Minnesota.

Beaudoin also played for the Miami Dolphins and San Diego Chargers.

References

External links
New England Patriots bio

1951 births
Living people
American football safeties
Minnesota Golden Gophers football players
New England Patriots players
Miami Dolphins players
San Diego Chargers players
People from Dickinson, North Dakota
Players of American football from North Dakota 
Tampa Bay Bandits players